Brendan Ranford (born May 3, 1992) is a Canadian professional ice hockey forward. He is currently playing under contract with Löwen Frankfurt in the Deutsche Eishockey Liga (DEL).

He was selected 209th overall in the 2010 NHL Entry Draft by the Philadelphia Flyers. He is the nephew of former National Hockey League goaltender Bill Ranford.

Playing career

Junior
As a youth, Ranford played in the 2004 and 2005 Quebec International Pee-Wee Hockey Tournaments with a minor ice hockey team from North Vancouver.

Ranford first played junior hockey in his native Edmonton with the Edmonton Canadians in the Alberta Midget Hockey League before he was drafted 15th overall in the 2007 WHL draft by the Kamloops Blazers. Ranford played major junior hockey for parts of six seasons in the Western Hockey League (WHL) with the Kamloops Blazers (2007–08 to 2012–13), registering 137 goals and 220 assists for 357 points, while earning 298 penalty minutes, in 348 WHL regular-season games. He was recognized for his outstanding play when he was named to the 2010–11 Second All-Star Team. Ranford spent the entirety of his major junior career with the Blazers over six seasons, culminating in being selected by the Philadelphia Flyers in the 2010 NHL Entry Draft.

Professional
Unsigned from the Flyers and at the beginning of his professional career, Ranford signed a try-out contract with the Texas Stars of the American Hockey League on May 24, 2013, a team owned by Tom Gaglardi who also owned the Blazers. After a successful training camp with Texas, Ranford was signed to a one-year AHL contract to begin his rookie professional season in 2013–14 season. Ranford enjoyed a successful debut season with the Stars, scoring 33 points in 65 games. During the 2014 Calder Cup playoffs Ranford topped all rookies by scoring 16 points as he led his team to capture their first ever Calder Cup.

On July 2, 2014, Ranford was signed as a free agent by NHL affiliate, the Dallas Stars to a three-year entry-level contract.

During the 2016–17 season, in the midst of his fourth year with the Texas Stars, Ranford was traded along with Branden Troock to the Arizona Coyotes in exchange for Justin Peters and Justin Hache on February 1, 2017. Assigned directly to the Tucson Roadrunners, Ranford struggled to show his offensive upside going scoreless in 10 games before he was traded for a second time in a month at the NHL trade deadline. He was dealt by the Coyotes to the Colorado Avalanche in exchange for Joe Whitney on March 1, 2017. He immediately regained his scoring touch with the Rampage, playing out the season to record 17 points in 21 games.

As a free agent from the Avalanche, Ranford still opted to continue within the organization in agreeing to a one-year AHL contract with the Rampage on August 1, 2017.

After a second season with the Rampage, Ranford opted to leave North America as a free agent, agreeing to a one-year contract with German outfit, Eisbären Berlin of the Deutsche Eishockey Liga (DEL) on June 28, 2018.

Ranford continued his career in Europe after his lone season in Berlin, signing as a free agent mid-way into the 2019–20 season with Swedish club, Mora IK of the Allsvenskan on November 20, 2019. He continued his European journeyman career by signing a one-year deal with Slovakian club, HC Slovan Bratislava for the 2020–21 season.

Family
His uncle is the former NHL goaltender Bill Ranford.

Career statistics

Regular season and playoffs

International

Awards and honours

References

External links

1992 births
Living people
SC Bietigheim-Bissingen players
Canadian ice hockey left wingers
Canadian expatriate ice hockey players in Germany
Dallas Stars players
Eisbären Berlin players
Kamloops Blazers players
Löwen Frankfurt players
Mora IK players
Philadelphia Flyers draft picks
San Antonio Rampage players
HC Slovan Bratislava players
Ice hockey people from Edmonton
Texas Stars players
Tucson Roadrunners players
Canadian expatriate ice hockey players in the United States
Canadian expatriate ice hockey players in Slovakia
Canadian expatriate ice hockey players in Denmark
Canadian expatriate ice hockey players in Sweden